Eva Castillo (born Minerva Castillo; December 29, 1969 – March 22, 2022) was a Filipina singer.

Biography

Early life
Minerva Castillo started singing at the age of nine. She endured a childhood of emotional and financial poverty.

In her teenage years, Castillo used to compete in various amateur singing contests with Regine Velasquez. Castillo won over 300 trophies in these amateur singing contests.

A singing contest in the 1980s known as Ang Bagong Kampeon stopped their competition.

Rediscovery
At the  Regine: Roots to Riches, GMA-7's special offering for Velasquez's birthday, Castillo was rediscovered. She recorded the theme song of the show Sine Novela: Kung Aagawin Mo Ang Lahat Sa Akin. Allan K. hired Eva to perform in his club, Klownz, on Quezon Avenue every Thursday night. Castillo's life story was featured in the show SRO Cinemaserye, titled SRO Cinemaserye: The Eva Castillo Story, where Glaiza de Castro and Manilyn Reynes portray the adolescent and adult Castillo respectively. She also appears on SOP Rules.

Filmography

Television

Recordings

References

1969 births
2022 deaths
21st-century Filipino women singers
People from Tondo, Manila
Singers from Manila
20th-century Filipino women singers